Several vessels have been named Chance:

Mercantile vessels of the Age of Sail

Chance (1786 ship)
 was launched in 1786 at St John's Newfoundland. She became a slave ship in the triangular trade in enslaved people. Circa 1787 she was condemned on the coast of Africa as unfit for service.

Chance (1786 London ship)
 was a schooner launched in Virginia in 1779, probably under another name. From 1786 she traded between London and Africa, though she may have traded in slaves within African waters. A tornado on 28 March 1789 upset her. Her crew saved themselves, but abandoned her and the 33 slaves onboard. By chance, another vessel later was able to rescue the 11 slaves by then still alive.

Chance (1799 ship)
 was built in India c.1799. She was captured and recaptured before being lost near Saint Mary's Bay, Madagascar in May 1799.

Chance (1816 barque)
 was built in Salem, Massachusetts (possibly in 1846), as North West. She was renamed Chance in 1863 when owned in Australia. From 1874 to 1876 she was an Invercargill-based whaling ship before being reduced to a coaling hulk at Bluff. She was ashore at Bluff in 1902.

Royal Navy
  was a Jamaican privateer that the Spanish Navy captured in 1797 and named Galgo Inglés (English greyhound), and that the British captured in November 1799. In her brief career she detained, took, or destroyed a number of small prizes before October 1800, when she foundered, with the loss of most of her crew and passengers. The Admiralty had intended to rename her HMS Chance, but she was lost before the change could take effect.
  was an  launched by Associated SB, Seattle, on 27 November 1942. She was transferred to the UK on Lend Lease on 13 November 1943, where she was classified as a Catherine-class minesweeper. The UK returned her to the United States Navy in 1946, who sold her in March to the Turkish Navy, which named her Edremit. The Turkish Navy withdrew her from service in 1973.

Citations

Ship names